= Vasile Spătărelu =

Romanian composer

Vasile Spătărelu (21 April 1938, in Tâmna, județul Mehedinți – 24 March 2005, in Galați) was a Romanian composer.
